Klebs is a German surname. Notable people with the surname include:

Arnold Klebs (1870–1943), Swiss microbiologist and physician; son of Edwin Klebs
Edwin Klebs (1834–1913), German-born Swiss pathologist and army medic; father of Arnold Klebs
Elimar Klebs (1852–1918), German historian; brother of Georg Klebs
Georg Klebs (1857–1918), German botanist; brother of Elimar Klebs

See also
KLEB, American radio station in Louisiana 
Rosa Klebb, fictional villain in From Russia with Love (Ian Fleming novel, 1957/Terence Young film, 1963)
Sarah Hayes (crossword compiler) (pen named Rosa Klebb; born ?), British cryptic crossword setter

German-language surnames